The 2013 Riga City Council election was held on June 1, 2013, to elect Riga City Council, the unicameral local legislature of the Riga, as part of municipal elections across the country. At stake were all 60 seats in the City Council.

After 2009 elections Harmony created coalition with Christian-Democratic LPP/LC and Nils Ušakovs became Mayor of Riga. Ušakovs' popularity among Rigans had grown steadily, and 73% of the city's residents approved of Ušakovs' performance in December 2010. In 2011, LPP/LC party was dissolved and Harmony started ruling alone. In late 2012 Harmony united with political party Honor to serve Riga to participate in 2013 elections

As a result of the election, Harmony and Honor to Serve Riga union received 39 of 60 seats and in June Nils Ušakovs was re-elected as mayor of Riga.

Results

Overall

References

2013
Politics of Riga
2013 in Latvia